Macon Historic District may refer to:

Macon Historic District (Macon, Georgia), listed on the National Register of Historic Places in Bibb County, Georgia
Macon Historic District (Macon, Mississippi), listed on the National Register of Historic Places in Noxubee County, Mississippi